Figueroa at Wilshire, formerly Sanwa Bank Plaza, is a 53-storey,  skyscraper in Los Angeles, California, United States. It is the eighth-tallest building in Los Angeles. It was designed by Albert C. Martin & Associates, and developed by Hines Interests Limited Partnership. It won the Rose Award for "Outstanding New Office Building" in 1991. The tower was constructed from 1988 to 1990 on the site of the former St. Paul's Episcopal Cathedral.

Major tenants
 PricewaterhouseCoopers
 ACE Group
 Cozen O'Connor
 Milbank, Tweed, Hadley & McCloy
 SNR Denton
 Morgan Stanley
 Cushman & Wakefield
 HCC Surety Group

See also
List of tallest buildings in Los Angeles
List of tallest buildings in the United States

References

Skyscraper office buildings in Los Angeles
Office buildings completed in 1990
Brookfield Properties buildings
Westlake, Los Angeles